Gustav Emil Bernhard Bodo von Kessel (6 April 1846 – 28 May 1918) was a German general who served in the Austro-Prussian War, the Franco-Prussian War and World War I.

Biography
Gustav von Kessel was born on 6 April 1846 in Potsdam, Prussia. He came from a Prussian military family that produced several generals and politicians, including his father Generalmajor Emil von Kessel. He attended various schools, including the Liegnitz Ritter-Akademie, and in 1864 enlisted in the 1st Foot Guards; being commissioned as Sekondeleutnant a year later. He participated in the Austro-Prussian War, being wounded at the Battle of Königgrätz, and the Franco-Prussian War, being wounded at the Battle of Gravelotte.

He was promoted to Premierleutnant in 1872, went to the Prussian Staff College, served a tour in the German General Staff and was made Hauptmann in command of a company in 1878. Later he became adjutant to the crown prince Friedrich Wilhelm, who'd briefly rule as Emperor Frederick III before dying from cancer. With the later's son Wilhelm II ascending to the throne; von Kessel again served the sovereign as adjutant. Continuing to climb the career ladder; he became a Generalmajor in 1896 and three years later a Generalleutnant and Generaladjutant to the Emperor.

As imperial adjutant posts frequently were coupled with positions in the guards; he led his old regiment, the brigade and both the 2nd and 1st guards infantry divisions before eventually receiving command of the Guard Corps in 1902.

From 1909 onwards von Kessel was Military Governor of Berlin and the surrounding province, serving on said post throughout World War I. When the strikes took place from January of 1918, Kessel suppressed the strikes using militaries. He died on 28 May 1918, and Alexander von Linsingen was his successor.

Honours
Among his orders and decorations were:
German honours

Foreign honours

Military appointments
Inhaber of the 20th (3rd Brandenburg) Infantry Regiment "Count Tauentzien von Wittenberg"

See also
List of German colonel generals

References

Sources
 

1846 births
1918 deaths
Prussian people of the Austro-Prussian War
German military personnel of the Franco-Prussian War
Colonel generals of Prussia
German Army generals of World War I
Recipients of the Iron Cross (1870), 2nd class
Commanders of the Order of Franz Joseph
Grand Crosses of the Military Merit Order (Bavaria)
Grand Crosses of the Order of Military Merit (Bulgaria)
Grand Crosses of the Order of the Dannebrog
Knights Grand Cross of the Order of Saints Maurice and Lazarus
Recipients of the Order of the Crown (Italy)
Recipients of the Order of the Sacred Treasure, 1st class
Recipients of the Order of the Medjidie, 1st class
Commanders of the Order of the Netherlands Lion
Knights Grand Cross of the Order of Orange-Nassau
Recipients of the Order of the White Eagle (Russia)
Recipients of the Order of St. Anna, 1st class
Recipients of the Order of the Cross of Takovo
Grand Crosses of Military Merit
Knights Grand Cross of the Order of Isabella the Catholic
Commanders Grand Cross of the Order of the Sword
Annulled Honorary Knights Grand Cross of the Royal Victorian Order
Military personnel from Potsdam